C-MAC is the television technology variant approved by the European Broadcasting Union (EBU) for satellite transmissions. The digital information is modulated using 2-4PSK (phase-shift keying), a variation of quadrature PSK where only two of the phaser angles (±90°) are used.
 The data capacity for C-MAC is 3 Mbit/s.
 C-MAC data has to be sent to the transmitter separately from the vision.
 The transmitter switches between FM (vision) and PSK (sound/data) modulation during each television line period.

C-MAC variants : E-MAC 
E-MAC (Extended MAC) is 16:9 version of C-MAC. Originally E-MAC was designed for 15:9 pictures, it later adopted the 16:9 aspect ratio.
 In E-MAC all the 4:3 information is transmitted exactly as in C-MAC so that C-MAC receivers are still compatible.
 E-MAC hides extra luminance and chrominance information in the field blanking interval and parts of the line blanking interval.
 E-MAC has a lower data capacity because luminance is hidden where data would usually be located.
 A 'steering' signal is transmitted to indicate to the 16:9 receiver whereabouts the 4:3 picture information.
 E-MAC receivers stitch the 4:3 and helper wide-screen data into a seamless 16:9 picture.

Technical details 
MAC transmits luminance and chrominance data separately in time rather than separately in frequency (as other analog television formats do, such as composite video).

Audio and Scrambling (selective access)
 Audio, in a format similar to NICAM was transmitted digitally rather than as an FM sub-carrier.
 The MAC standard included a standard scrambling system, Euro-Crypt, a precursor to the standard DVB-CSA encryption system.

See also 
TV transmission systems
 Analog high-definition television systems
 DVB-S
 DVB-T
 Multiplexed Analogue Components
 PAL
 SECAM

References 

Television technology
Video formats